Mount Stanley or Mount Ngaliema (also) is a mountain located in the Rwenzori range. With an elevation of 5,109 m (16,763 ft), it is the highest mountain of both the Democratic Republic of the Congo and Uganda, and the third highest in Africa, after Kilimanjaro (5,895 m) and Mount Kenya (5,199 m). The peak and several other surrounding peaks are high enough to support glaciers. Mount Stanley is named for the journalist and explorer, Sir Henry Morton Stanley. It is part of the Rwenzori Mountains National Park, a UNESCO world Heritage Site.

Mt. Stanley consists of two twin summits and several lower peaks:
{| class="wikitable"
! align=left|Peak  !! metres !! feet
|-
|Margherita Peak  || 5,109 || 16,763
|-
|Alexandra   ||	5,091 || 16,703
|-
|Albert      || 5,087 || 16,690
|-
|Savoia      || 4,977 || 16,330
|-
|Ellena      || 4,968 || 16,300
|-
|Elizabeth   || 4,929 || 16,170
|-
|Phillip     || 4,920 || 16,140
|-
|Moebius     || 4,916 || 16,130
|-
|Great Tooth || 4,603 || 15,100
|}

Expeditions

First ascent
The first recorded ascent of Mt. Stanley was in 1906 by Luigi Amedeo, J. Petigax, C. Ollier, and J. Brocherel.  Margherita Peak is named after Queen Margherita of Italy.

References

External links
 Information about Mount Stanley and the Ruwenzori Range
 Mount Stanley on Peak Bagger
 
 

Rwenzori Mountains
Great Rift Valley
Mountains of Uganda
Mountains of the Democratic Republic of the Congo
Democratic Republic of the Congo–Uganda border
International mountains of Africa
Five-thousanders of Africa
Highest points of countries